Plains bristlegrass is a common name for several grasses native to North America and may refer to:

Setaria leucopila
Setaria texana
Setaria vulpiseta

References